The Agongdian River is a river in Taiwan.

Name
Indigenous people who resided in the area called it Agongtoan. Min Chinese speakers from Fujian changed the pronunciation to "a-kong tiàm" (grandpa's shop), and used it for both Gangshan District, as well as the Agongdian River. Efforts to dam the river began in 1942, when Taiwanese was under Japanese rule. However, flood damage resulted in the suspension of the project, which was completed in 1953. The river now shares its name with the completed reservoir and Agongdian Forest Park.

Geology

Transportation
The river is accessible within walking distance North of Gangshan South Station of Kaohsiung MRT.

See also
List of rivers in Taiwan

References

Rivers of Taiwan
Landforms of Kaohsiung